Hystopia is a 2016 novel by David Means. The novel was described by literary critic Christian Lorentzen as "a counterfactual narrative by a Vietnam veteran about his experience in a therapeutic, psychedelics-based trauma recovery program initiated by an unassassinated John F. Kennedy."

In July 2016, it was longlisted for the 2016 Man Booker Prize.

Awards 
2016 Man Booker Prize, longlistee.

References

2016 American novels
Farrar, Straus and Giroux books
Novels set in Michigan